Portrait of Fabrizio Salvaresio is an oil painting by Titian. It is signed and dated 1558, and hangs today in the Kunsthistorisches Museum in Vienna.

Analysis 

According to Georg Gronau, though damaged and repainted, this seems to be a genuine work by Titian, but not of very good quality. The names of sitter and painter appear on the Tabula ansata in the background, along with the date of composition, 1558. It is signed, "M.DLVIII, Fabricius Salvaresius, Annv̄ Agens ʟ, Titiani Opus". 

Salvaresio is portrayed as a wealthy merchant with an air of self-confidence, and the negro boy painted in profile at the bottom right of the picture may refer to involvement in the slave trade.

Provenance 
From the collection of Archduke Leopold Wilhelm, which, in 1662, came into the possession of Emperor Leopold.
 1636—Collection of Bartolomeo della Nave, Venice;
 1638–1649—Collection of the Duke of Hamilton (possibly);
 Collection of Archduke Leopold Wilhelm.

Gallery

References

Sources 

 Gronau, Georg (1904). Titian. London: Duckworth and Co; New York: Charles Scribner's Sons. p. 275.
 Ricketts, Charles (1910). Titian. London: Methuen & Co. Ltd. p. 175.
 "Fabrizio Salvaresio". Kunsthistorisches Museum Wien. Retrieved 23 November 2022.

Portraits by Titian
Paintings in the collection of the Kunsthistorisches Museum
1558 paintings